Alexandra "Sandra" Chick (born 2 June 1947) is a former field hockey player from Zimbabwe, who was a member of the national team that won the gold medal at the 1980 Summer Olympics in Moscow.

Her identical twin sister Sonia Robertson was one of her teammates in the capital of the Soviet Union, and both are the first twin gold medalists in hockey.

Because of the boycott of the United States and other countries, only one team was available to compete in the women's field hockey tournament: the hosting USSR team. A late request was sent to the government of the African nation, which quickly assembled a team less than a week before the competition started. To everyone's surprise they won, claiming Zimbabwe's only medal in the 1980 Games.

References
sports-reference

External links
 

1947 births
Living people
People from Burnham Market
British emigrants to Rhodesia
Zimbabwean female field hockey players
Olympic field hockey players of Zimbabwe
Field hockey players at the 1980 Summer Olympics
Olympic gold medalists for Zimbabwe
Olympic medalists in field hockey
Medalists at the 1980 Summer Olympics
Zimbabwean twins
Twin sportspeople
Zimbabwean people of English descent
White Zimbabwean sportspeople